Remember Sunday is a 2013 American romantic drama film directed by Jeff Bleckner, written by Michael Kase and Barry Morrow, and starring Zachary Levi and Alexis Bledel.

Plot
The story follows the characters of Molly (Bledel), a struggling waitress, and Gus (Levi), a jewelry store employee. Gus and Molly meet through a chance encounter when Gus is at Molly's diner waiting for his best friend. Molly sees Gus reciting notes into his pen recorder and when he goes to take a phone call she leaves a message on it for him. Soon after, Molly and Gus begin to date.  Molly does not yet realize it, but Gus is unable
to make new memories due to having had a brain aneurysm years before. As a result, he forgets the day's events every time he goes to sleep. Molly soon finds out that he has been recording all of their conversations on his pen. Gus tries to explain, but Molly mistakes it for being a disturbing and creepy habit. A few weeks later Molly returns to the apartment to find Gus's sister Lucy who explains everything and gives Molly the file folder Gus had filled with mementos and notes of their time together. Molly visits the hospital where Gus is under observation and introduces herself as his girlfriend.  She shows him the folder so he can learn more about their relationship. We learn that prior to having his aneurysm, Gus was meant to be the next Einstein working at Caltech and the Mt. Wilson telescope in southern California. Molly takes Gus there, where he visits with his old colleagues. While visiting, they let him know that his work will help them to better understand the universe.  Molly also meets Gus's ex-fiancée (one of his former co-workers) who explains why things had ended between them and warns her of the difficulties that any sort of serious relationship will have.  Gus also tells Molly to leave him if an operation to fix his brain damage does not work. Gus's sister tells Molly that Gus has actually already had this operation, but it did not work. That night Molly sees a note on Gus's laptop to ask her to marry him the next day. Molly deletes the note after reflecting on what Gus had told her to do and Gus wakes up the next day without any memory of her. Molly continues her life with almost a quarter million dollars that she finally received from her great aunt's inheritance. With those extra funds she pays off her student loans and achieves her long standing dream of starting her own flower business. One day, while working at a wedding, a shooting star appears and Molly is reminded of Gus. She visits him at the jewelry shop he works at the next day.  He recognizes her name from an envelope he had kept containing an antique ring that had belonged to Molly's great aunt. Shortly after they had originally met, Molly had come to the shop and had sold the ring to Gus for $200 that she had desperately needed. At the time the ring was in bad shape and missing half its stones. Gus had repaired the ring and kept it to return to Molly someday at no expense. He gives it back to her and she begins to cry tears of happiness and hints to him that they know each other. Gus is remembering something - her name - when he goes to retrieve the ring from the back of the store where he put it for safe keeping. We may take this as a hint that his ability to remember is slowly returning or, romantically, love has not forgotten her.  Molly asks Gus if he would like to go out for coffee with her and says she knows a great place.

Cast 
 Alexis Bledel - Molly
 Zachary Levi - Gus
 Merritt Wever - Lucy
 Barry Shabaka Henley - Baptiste
 Valerie Azlynn - Jolene
 David Hoffman - Jerry
 Jerry Adler - Sam
 Ann McKenzie - Ardis Applebaum
 Dana Gourrier - Bernadette
 Larisa Oleynik - Lauren
 James DuMont - Dr. Felton
 Griff Furst - Professor Lawrence
 Richard Topol - Mccray
 Chris Conner - Lazlo
 Billy Slaughter - Jim

DVD release

See also
Anterograde amnesia

References

External links

2013 television films
2013 films
Hallmark Hall of Fame episodes
Films set in New Orleans
American romantic drama films
Films directed by Jeff Bleckner
Films scored by Christopher Lennertz
American drama television films
2010s American films